Vincent Cobos (born 4 March 1965) is a French retired footballer who played as a central defender.

Football career
Cobos was born in Strasbourg. For nine seasons, he played professionally with hometown's RC Strasbourg, including two as captain, and helped his team achieve promotion to Ligue 1 in 1987–88 as champions.

Cobos retired from the game at only 28, after two years with lowly SAS Épinal. He appeared in 235 games all competitions comprised with his main club.

Personal life / Post-retirement
Cobos' younger brother, José, was also a footballer and a defender. He too played for Strasbourg, and the siblings shared teams from 1988 to 1991.

After retiring, Cobos worked with Canal+'s show Foot+.

External links
RC Strasbourg archives 

1965 births
Living people
Footballers from Strasbourg
French people of Spanish descent
French footballers
Association football defenders
Ligue 1 players
Ligue 2 players
RC Strasbourg Alsace players
SAS Épinal players